Calyx is a genus of sea sponges of the family Phloeodictyidae.

Species 
Species accepted within Calyx:

 Calyx arcuarius (Topsent, 1913) 
 Calyx clavata Burton, 1928
 Calyx imperialis (Dendy, 1924) 
 Calyx infundibulum Pulitzer-Finali, 1993
 Calyx kerguelensis (Hentschel, 1914) 
 Calyx magnoculata Van Soest, Meesters & Becking, 2014
 Calyx maya Gómez & Calderón-Gutiérrez, 2020
 Calyx nicaeensis (Risso, 1827) 
 Calyx nyaliensis Pulitzer-Finali, 1993
 Calyx podatypa (Laubenfels, 1934) 
 Calyx shackletoni Goodwin, Brewin & Brickle, 2012
 Calyx tufa (Ridley & Dendy, 1886) 

Species brought into synonymy:
 Calyx nicaensis accepted as Calyx nicaeensis (Risso, 1827) (misspelling of species name)
 Calyx poa de Laubenfels, 1947 accepted as Halichondria poa (de Laubenfels, 1947) (genus transfer)
 Calyx santa (de Laubenfels, 1936) accepted as Neopetrosia carbonaria (Lamarck, 1814) (genus transfer and junior synonym)
 Calyx stipitatus Topsent, 1916 accepted as Calyx arcuarius (Topsent, 1913) (junior synonym)

References

Animals described in 1885
Haplosclerida
Sponge genera